Craig (Robert) McConnell is a Canadian music producer, songwriter, and film and television composer. His first credit was for writing a song used in the 2002 television film A Killing Spring.

In 2019, he produced and co-wrote "The Chase" for Celine Dion's album Courage. In 2018, he produced and co-wrote "Carnival Hearts" (Top 20 Billboard CHR) "What You're Made Of" (Top 10 Billboard Hot AC) for Kayla Diamond (Cadence/Universal), and worked with Priyanka (Canada's Drag Race) on three songs from her EP Taste Test as well as Priyanka’s single, ”Country Queen” . Other artist collaborators have included Keshia Chanté (Tanjola/Universal), Crystal Kay (Epic/Sony Japan), Jane Zhang (Sony Music China), CHEMISTRY (DefStar/Sony) and Juno-winner Divine Brown.

His film scoring credits include Irvine Welsh's Ecstasy (from the author of Trainspotting), Textuality (starring Jason Lewis), Animal 2 (starring Ving Rhames) and 5ive Girls (starring Ron Perlman). For television, he has composed for international TV series such as Word Girl (PBS), Wedding SOS (Slice) and Property Virgins (HGTV). Along with partner Justin Forsley, he wrote the theme song and underscores for the Nickelodeon sitcoms Life With Boys, Max & Shred and Star Falls.

In 2012, he was nominated for "Best Music" at the 2012 British Independent Film Festival (BIFF) Awards for his work on Irvine Welsh's Ecstasy.

McConnell holds a B.A.Sc from the University of Toronto (Engineering Science) and served two terms on the board of directors of the Screen Composers Guild of Canada. He is also the President of the Production Music company hard Music Design.

External links
 
 

Canadian film score composers
Male film score composers
Canadian record producers
Canadian television composers
Musicians from Toronto
University of Toronto alumni
Living people
Place of birth missing (living people)
1978 births